Alp Kırşan (born 3 November 1979) is a Turkish actor.

Kırşan began his career as a professional model. He was chosen as 'Best Model of Turkey' in 2002. He hosted a program Sabah Şekerleri with Özlem Yıldız. He began his acting with a play Oyunun Oyunu at the Yasemin Yalçın Theatre. Kırşan became well known for his role as Yiğit in the sitcom Çat Kapı and has since acted in several films and TV series, usually in comedic roles.

Filmography

References

External links

1979 births
Living people
Turkish male film actors
Turkish male television actors
Turkish male models